Sean Oppenheimer (born 7 October 1967) is a Nauruan politician and businessman who was a Member of Parliament for Anetan from 9 July 2016 to 27 August 2019. He was a member of the Opposition. Oppenheimer is the owner of the retail store Capelle & Partner.

Career
Oppenheimer was elected in the July 2016 elections to the Parliament of Nauru, representing the constituency of Anetan. He was not invited to form part of the government and so joined Riddel Akua and Kieren Keke as a default member of the 3 member opposition. He served in a number of official capacities over the years:

Vice Chairman Nauru Fisheries, 1997–1998
President Nauru Boxing Federation, 2008–Present
Nauru Olympic Committee Executive Member, 2009–2013
Nauru Olympic Committee Vice President, 2013–Present
Oceania Boxing Confederation Executive Board Member, 2013–Present
Honorary Consul for Israel to Nauru, 2011–2016
He did not run for reelection in 2019.

Oppenheimer runs the largest private business in Nauru, Capelle & Partner, which has more than 150 employees. It was founded by Oppenheimer's parents in 1965. It has several different business lines including the largest retail store in the country with supermarket and hardware provisions as well as accommodation, car rental and boat chartering services.

Personal life
Sean Oppenheimer is married and has 5 children. As a child he attended Yaren Primary School, Aiwo Primary School, Nauru High School and Caulfield Grammar School in Melbourne.

His father, Desmond Oppenheimer, was born in Ireland and migrated to Australia as a child. His mother, Sophie Oppenheimer, is a native Nauruan. Oppenheimer's maternal granduncle, Hammer DeRoburt was the first president of Nauru when the country became independent in 1968.

See also
 Politics of Nauru

References

External links

1967 births
Living people
Members of the Parliament of Nauru
People from Anetan District
21st-century Nauruan politicians